Soldier Township may refer to the following townships in the United States:

 Soldier Township, Crawford County, Iowa
 Soldier Township, Jackson County, Kansas
 Soldier Township, Shawnee County, Kansas